The Panchsheel Park metro station is located on the Magenta Line of the Delhi Metro. It was opened to public on 29 May 2018.

History

The station

Station layout

Entry/exit

Connections

Bus
Delhi Transport Corporation bus routes number 448B, 511, 511A, 540ACL, 540CL, 764, 764EXT, 764S, 774, AC-764, serves the station from nearby Panchsheel Park bus stop.

See also

Delhi
List of Delhi Metro stations
Transport in Delhi
Delhi Metro Rail Corporation
Delhi Suburban Railway
Delhi Monorail
Delhi Transport Corporation
South East Delhi
National Capital Region (India)
List of rapid transit systems
List of metro systems

References

External links

 Delhi Metro Rail Corporation Ltd. (Official site)
 Delhi Metro Annual Reports
 

Delhi Metro stations
Railway stations in South Delhi district